Colorado City is a census-designated place (CDP) and post office in and governed by Pueblo County, Colorado, United States. The CDP is a part of the Pueblo, CO Metropolitan Statistical Area. The Colorado City post office has the ZIP Code 81019 (post office boxes). At the United States Census 2010, the population of the Colorado City CDP was 2,193, while the population of the 81019 ZIP Code Tabulation Area was 1,690. The Colorado City Metropolitan District provides services.

Geography
Colorado City is located in the Greenhorn Valley.

History
The first settlement at the site of Colorado City was called Greenhorn after the name of an 18th century Comanche chief (Cuerno Verde in Spanish). In 1845, mountain man John Brown, his wife Luisa Sandoval, and several children established a trading post where the Trapper's Trail to Taos, New Mexico crossed Greenhorn Creek. Brown and his family left Greenhorn for California in 1849. In 1853, Lt. Edward Griffin Beckwith, an army officer, said of Greenhorn, "six New Mexican families had built an irrigation system to divert the water from Greenhorn Creek to water their crops of corn, wheat, beans and watermelon. Their homes were built of adobe which stood shoulder to shoulder and were surrounded by a close fence of high pickets. They also had corrals for the safe keeping of their stock."

Demographics

Government

Colorado City is a metropolitan district, a type of special district established under Colorado law. It is governed by an elected, five-member board of directors and managed by an appointed district manager.

The metropolitan district operates Lake Beckwith, which provides recreational opportunities for residents and visitors. The lake also forms the Lake Beckwith State Wildlife Area, one of several hundred state wildlife areas in Colorado managed by Colorado Parks and Wildlife. Colorado City also has a public golf course and club house.

See also

 List of census-designated places in Colorado

References

External links

 Colorado City @ Colorado.com
 Colorado City @ UncoverColorado.com
 Colorado City Metropolitan District website
 Colorado City Parks and Recreation District website
 Pueblo County website

Census-designated places in Pueblo County, Colorado
Census-designated places in Colorado